The nakfa (ISO 4217 code: ERN;  naḳfa, or  or نقفة nākfā) is the currency of Eritrea and was introduced on 15 November 1998 to replace the Ethiopian birr at par. The currency takes its name from the Eritrean town of Nakfa, site of the first major victory of the Eritrean War of Independence. The nakfa is divided into 100 cents.

The nakfa is pegged to the US dollar at a fixed rate of US$1 = ERN 15. At earlier times, it was officially pegged at US$1 = ERN 13.50. The currency is not fully convertible, so black market rates available on the streets typically offered a rate of 15 nakfas per dollar.

Between 18 November and 31 December 2015, the Bank of Eritrea began replacement of all nakfa banknotes. The banknote replacement initiative was designed to combat counterfeiting, the informal economy but primarily Sudanese human traffickers who had accepted payments in nakfa banknotes in exchange for transporting would-be migrants primarily to Europe. A consequence of this was substantial amounts of the country's currency existed in vast hoards outside of Eritrea.

The plan to replace the country's currency was top secret and designed to prevent human traffickers bringing their funds back in time to exchange for the new banknotes. On 1 January 2016 the old nakfa banknotes ceased being recognized as legal tender, rendering external stockpiles of currency worthless.

The current series of banknotes is the artwork of an Afro-American banknote designer, Clarence Holbert, and printed by German currency printer Giesecke & Devrient.

Coins
Nakfa coins are made entirely of nickel-clad steel. Each coin has a different reeded edge, instead of consistent reeding for all denominations. The 1 nakfa coin carries the denomination "100 cents". 
Coin denominations:
1 cent
5 cents
10 cents
25 cents
50 cents
1 nakfa (100 cents)

Banknotes
The nakfa banknotes were designed by Clarence Holbert of the United States Bureau of Engraving and Printing in 1994.

Banknotes come in denominations of:
1 nakfa
5 nakfa
10 nakfa
20 nakfa
50 nakfa
100 nakfa
There have been five series of banknotes since the currency's launch. The first issue for all denominations was dated 24.5.1997; the second issue consists of only the 50 and 100 nakfa notes and is dated 24.5.2004; the third issues also consists of only the 50 and 100 nakfa notes and was dated 24.5.2011, and the fourth issues consisted of only the 10 and 20 nakfa notes and was dated 24.5.2012. (May 24 is Eritrea's Independence Day). The current fifth banknote series which rendered all previous currency valueless is dated 24.5.2015.

Exchange rate 

Eritrea's government has resisted calls to float the nation's currency, preferring the stability of a fixed exchange rate. However periodic devaluations have been made. ERN is a very weak currency. The de facto exchange rate of the currency is around 100 ERN for US$1. The currency does not have a good demand outside of Eritrea. The black markets that exist in Asmara and a few other towns show the diminishing values of ERN.

See also
 Economy of Eritrea

References

External links
Regulations concerning the nakfa from Afrol news

Fixed exchange rate
Currencies introduced in 1997